Georgina "Georgie" Parker (born 26 April 1989) is an Australian rules footballer and former field hockey player for the Hockeyroos.

Parker was a member of the Australia women's national field hockey team that were defeated by the Netherlands women's national field hockey team in the final of the 2014 Women's Hockey World Cup, a gold medal winner at the 2014 Commonwealth Games and member of the team that went to the 2016 Summer Olympics.

Personal
Parker lives in Perth, Western Australia, as part of the national training program, having grown up in South Australia.

Field hockey

Club hockey
Parker played club hockey in the Riverland as a junior and later in Adelaide for the Adelaide Hockey Club. She also played a season for the Royal Antwerp Hockey Club in Belgium in 2016/17.

State hockey
In 2011, Parker was a member of the Australian Hockey League team the SA Suns (formerly Southern Suns) that won the national championship in Darwin. She was the only goalscorer in the grand final winning 1–0 against the NSW Arrows.

International hockey
Parker has played over 100 international games for the Hockeyroos, including playing at the Commonwealth Games, Summer Olympics and World Cup.

Her tournaments include:
2011 – Champions Trophy (Amstelveen, Netherlands) – 6th
2013 – World League Finals (Tucuman, Argentina) – 2nd
2013 – Oceania Cup (Stratford, New Zealand) – 1st
2013 – World League Semi-Final (London, England) – 1st
2013 – Hockey Super Series 9's (Perth, Australia) – 1st
2014 – 2014 Commonwealth Games (Glasgow, Scotland) – 1st
2014 – Women's Hockey World Cup (The Hague, Netherlands) –  2nd
2015 – World League Semi-Final (Antwerp, Belgium)- 3rd
2015 – Hawke's Bay Hockey Festival (Hawke's Bay, New Zealand) – 1st
2016 – Hawke's Bay Hockey Festival (Hawke's Bay, New Zealand) – 3rd
2016 – 2016 Women's Hockey Champions Trophy (London, Great Britain) – 4th
2016 – 2016 Summer Olympics (Rio de Janeiro, Brazil) – quarter finals

AFL Women's career

In May 2017, Parker signed with Collingwood as a rookie for the 2018 AFL Women's season, fielding an offer from Adelaide too. She had no prior experience playing Australian football, but Collingwood viewed her as a potential midfield and forward line option.

On 4 June 2018, Parker was elevated to Collingwood's senior list ahead of the 2019 season.

In April 2019, Parker was delisted by Collingwood.

Statistics
Statistics are correct to the end of the 2019 season.

|- style="background-color: #eaeaea"
! scope="row" style="text-align:center" | 2018
|style="text-align:center;"|
| 19 || 2 || 0 || 0 || 4 || 7 || 11 || 1 || 3 || 0.0 || 0.0 || 2.0 || 3.5 || 5.5 || 0.5 || 1.5
|- 
! scope="row" style="text-align:center" | 2019
|style="text-align:center;"|
| 19 || 1 || 0 || 0 || 2 || 0 || 2 || 0 || 4 || 0.0 || 0.0 || 2.0 || 0.0 || 2.0 || 0.0 || 4.0
|- class="sortbottom"
! colspan=3| Career
! 3
! 0
! 0
! 6
! 7
! 13
! 1
! 7
! 0.0
! 0.0
! 2.0
! 2.3
! 4.3
! 0.3
! 2.3
|}

Media Career
Parker has a double degree in Journalism and PR, and is available as a guest speaker.

As at 2022, she is the host of the Seven Network TV show "Armchair Experts" – an analysis of the Australian Football League scene.

References

External links

 
 
 
 
 
 
 
 
 
 

1989 births
Living people
Australian female field hockey players
Sportswomen from South Australia
Collingwood Football Club (AFLW) players
Australian rules footballers from South Australia
Field hockey players at the 2014 Commonwealth Games
Field hockey players at the 2016 Summer Olympics
Olympic field hockey players of Australia
Commonwealth Games medallists in field hockey
Commonwealth Games gold medallists for Australia
Australian expatriate sportspeople in Belgium
Expatriate field hockey players
Curtin University alumni
Field hockey people from South Australia
Medallists at the 2014 Commonwealth Games